The International Journal of Qualitative Methods is a quarterly peer-reviewed open access academic journal covering research methods with respect to qualitative and mixed methods research. It was established in 2002 and is published by SAGE Publications on behalf of the University of Alberta's International Institute for Qualitative Methodology, of which it is the official journal. The editor-in-chief is Linda Liebenberg (Dalhousie University). According to the Journal Citation Reports, the journal has a 2018 impact factor of 2.257, ranking it 17th out of 98 journals in the category "Social Sciences, Interdisciplinary".

References

External links

Qualitative research journals
SAGE Publishing academic journals
Publications established in 2002
Quarterly journals
English-language journals
Research methods journals